Highland Park Community College, formerly Highland Park Junior College, was a public community college located in Highland Park, Michigan.  Highland Park Community College was an urban campus and the focus of many efforts to benefit urban populations.

History
The college was founded in 1918 as Highland Park Junior College.

On May 21, 1954, the college has its radio station, WHPR-FM, sign on.

The college sold its radio station to R.J. Watkins Late Night Entertainment.  The school was closed in 1996. The Highland Park Career Academy was brought in to replace it.

Robert Elmes bought the campus for $18,000.

Programs
Among other programs the college had a nursing program.  WHPR-FM was originally run by Highland Park Community College.

Alumni
Among the alumni of Highland Park Community College is Michigan State Senator Martha G. Scott  as well as Detroit activist General Baker, Jr., and Radio Announcer, Karla Fox formerly of WJZZ/WCHB, Smooth Jazz V-98.7, Mix 92.3, WJLB, Radio One and other Broadcast Companies.

References

External links
 Highland Park Student Records and Transcripts" - Wayne RESA - Has instructions for obtaining HPCC transcripts

Defunct universities and colleges in Michigan
Highland Park, Michigan
Educational institutions established in 1918
Educational institutions disestablished in 1996
1918 establishments in Michigan
1996 disestablishments in Michigan